Finkenstein am Faaker See is a market town in the district of Villach-Land in Carinthia, Austria.

Geography
It is located south of Villach and the Drava River, on the northern slope of the Karawanks with Mt. Mittagskogel (Kepa), close to the border with Slovenia. The municipal area comprises the southern shore of Lake Faak.

The municipality includes the cadastral community of Faak am See (Bače), Ferlach (Borovlje), Fürnitz (Brnca), Greuth (Rute), Gödersdorf (Vodiča vas), Korpitsch (Grpiče), Latschach am Faakersee (Loče), Mallestig (Malošče) and Sankt Stefan (Šteben). According to the 2001 census, 5.6% of the population are Carinthian Slovenes.

History

The municipality is named after Finkenstein Castle, a possession of the Carinthian dukes, which was first mentioned in an 1142 deed. Lend to the ducal ministeriales, the Lords of Finkenstein, it was an important outpost overlooking the Gail valley and the Carinthian estates of the Bamberg prince-bishops around Villach and Federaun Castle vis-à-vis. In 1335 the ducal estates passed to the Austrian House of Habsburg.

In 1508 Emperor Maximilian I, Duke of Carinthia since 1493, granted Finkenstein to his liegeman Siegmund von Dietrichstein, whose descendants held the castle until 1861. From the 18th century on it decayed, only ruins remain. It is today the backdrop of the Burgarena Finkenstein, an amphitheatre with 1150 seats mainly used for concerts.

The Finkenstein municipality was established in 1850 at Mallestig, it became a market town in 1979. To advert to its location on the shore of Lake Faak, the official name is Finkenstein am Faaker See since 2000. The area largely depends on tourism, moreover Elan snowboards operates a factory in Fürnitz.

Politics
Seats in the municipal assembly (Gemeinderat) as of 2015 elections:
Social Democratic Party of Austria (SPÖ): 12
Austrian People's Party (ÖVP): 6
Freedom Party of Austria (FPÖ): 4
Freie Liste Sitter (independent): 2
Greens: 2
Unity List (EL): 1

Notable people
Franc Treiber (1809–1878), priest, poet, and composer
Günther Porod (1919–1984), physicist
Peter Wrolich (born 1974), bicycle racer, grew up in Latschach.

References

Cities and towns in Villach-Land District